White Rock, Arkansas could be one of two places:

 White Rock, Franklin County, Arkansas, an unincorporated community in White Rock Township, Franklin County, Arkansas
 White Rock, Washington County, Arkansas, an unincorporated community